Eugnosta cipoana is a species of moth of the family Tortricidae. It is found in Minas Gerais, Brazil.

The wingspan is about 14 mm. The ground colour of the forewings is whitish cream with ochreous suffusions. The basal half of the costa, the subapical spots along the costa, as well as the subterminal and terminal suffusions are brownish. The hindwings are brownish.

Etymology
The species name refers to the name of type locality, Serra do Cipó.

References

Moths described in 2007
Eugnosta